The Inheritance is a 1922 German silent drama film directed by Conrad Wiene and starring Rudolf Forster, Philipp Manning and Louis Ralph.

The film's sets were designed by the art director Karl Machus.

Cast
 Rudolf Forster
 Philipp Manning
 Louis Ralph
 Lili Alexandra
 Fritz Karchow
 Georg August Koch
 Hedwig Pauly-Winterstein

References

Bibliography
 Parish, Robert. Film Actors Guide. Scarecrow Press, 1977.

External links

1922 films
Films of the Weimar Republic
German silent feature films
Films directed by Conrad Wiene
German black-and-white films
1920s German films
Films shot at Terra Studios